Saperda fayi is a species of beetle in the family Cerambycidae. It was described by Bland in 1863. It is known from Canada and the United States.

Varietas
 Saperda fayi var. shoemakeri Davis, 1923
 Saperda fayi var. immaculipennis Breuning, 1952

References

fayi
Beetles described in 1863